Busala Airport  is a rural airstrip serving the village of Busala in Kwilu Province, Democratic Republic of the Congo.

See also

 Transport in the Democratic Republic of the Congo
 List of airports in the Democratic Republic of the Congo

References

External links
 OpenStreetMap - Busala Airport
 OurAirports - Busala Airport
 FallingRain - Busala Airport
 HERE Maps - Busala Airport
 

Airports in Kwilu Province